Persikos stands for Persatuan Sepakbola Indonesia Kota Sorong (en: Football Association of Indonesia Sorong City). Persikos Kota Sorong is an  Indonesian football club based in Sorong, Southwest Papua. They currently compete in the Liga 3.

References

External links
Liga-Indonesia.co.id

Football clubs in Indonesia
Football clubs in Southwest Papua